The Johnny Mathis Seniors Classic was a golf tournament on the Champions Tour from 1985 to 1986. It was played in Los Angeles, California at the Mountaingate Country Club.

The purse for the 1986 tournament was US$250,000, with $37,500 going to the winner. The tournament was founded in 1985 as the American Golf Carta Blanca Johnny Mathis Classic.

Winners
Johnny Mathis Seniors Classic
1986 Dale Douglass

American Golf Carta Blanca Johnny Mathis Classic
1985 Peter Thomson

Source:

References

Former PGA Tour Champions events
Golf in Los Angeles
1985 establishments in California
1986 disestablishments in California
Recurring sporting events established in 1985
Recurring sporting events disestablished in 1986